Belarus participated at the inaugural edition of the European Games in 2015.

Medal Tables

Medals by Games

Medals by sports

List of medallists

See also
 Belarus at the Olympics

References